Guanabara is a neighborhood in Joinville, Santa Catarina, Brazil. It is located southeast of the city center.

Neighbourhoods in Joinville